Anemosella nevalis is a species of snout moth in the genus Anemosella. It was described by William Barnes and Foster Hendrickson Benjamin in 1925. It is found in North America, including Nevada, California and Arizona.

References

Moths described in 1925
Chrysauginae
Moths of North America